"1st Man in Space" is a song by the English electronic music group All Seeing I, based in Sheffield. It was the third single to be released from the album Pickled Eggs and Sherbet (1999).

It features vocals by Philip Oakey of the Human League on what is essentially an update of David Bowie's "Space Oddity" and Elton John's "Rocket Man". The lyrics were written by another Sheffield musician, Jarvis Cocker of Pulp.

The single reached number 28 on the UK Singles Chart when released in September 1999.

Track listings

CD 1
  "1st Man in Space" (Radio Edit) (3:46) 
  "1st Man in Space" (Album Version) (5:00)
  "Sweet Music" (7:21)

CD 2
  "1st Man in Space" (Long Version) (5:45)
  "Dirty Slapper" (6:27)
  "No Pop I" (3:14)

Personnel
 Philip Oakey - vocals
 Jarvis Cocker - lyrics, guitars

The All Seeing I 
 Dean Honer - keyboards
 Jason Buckle - guitars, bass
 Richard Barrett (DJ Parrot) - drums, programming

External links
http://www.the-black-hit-of-space.dk/be_my_lover.htm
http://www.the-black-hit-of-space.dk/first_man_in_space_review.htm
http://www.pulpwiki.net/Jarvis/1stManInSpace

References 

1999 songs
1999 singles
Songs written by Jarvis Cocker
FFRR Records singles
The All Seeing I songs
Philip Oakey songs